ECAC West was a college athletic conference which operated in the northeastern United States until 2017. It participated in the NCAA's Division III as a hockey-only conference. The conference ceased to exist after the end of the 2016–17 season when most joined the newly formed United Collegiate Hockey Conference or Northeast Women's Hockey League.

History
ECAC West was officially formed in 1984 when ECAC 2 was split in two and both new conferences dropped down to Division III. The conference consisted entirely of schools from upstate New York until 1988 when Mercyhurst joined. In 1992 all universities that were members SUNYAC and a few other schools left when Mercyhurst took part in the effort was made to restart the Division II Championship, leaving just seven teams in the ECAC West. After two more schools dropped their programs the conference was down to five teams in 1994 but it began to recover when Niagara joined in 1996. In 1998 the conference lost two programs when the MAAC began sponsoring a Division I ice hockey conference followed by a third just one year later. When the Division II Tournament ended in 1999 the conference returned to D-III and was left with only four schools but in 2001 it began to sponsor women's hockey as well and its ranks immediately swelled to nine universities. The conference roster continued to grow, reaching 15 in 2016–17 but after that season all but one league member left to join either the United Collegiate Hockey Conference or Northeast Women's Hockey League with the lone remaining school (Hobart) joining the New England Hockey Conference.

ECAC West Tournaments

Members

† as of 2018

Membership timeline

References

External links
 Men's official web site
 Women's official web site

NCAA Division III ice hockey conferences
Organizations disestablished in 2017